Scardia amurensis is a moth of the family Tineidae. It is found in the Russian Far East (Amur, Primorskii), Japan and possibly adjacent parts of China. In North America, it has been recorded from Georgia, Maryland, Mississippi, New Jersey, North Carolina, South Carolina, Texas and West Virginia.

The wingspan is about 40 mm. There are cream markings on the forewings, extending along the entire length of the dorsal margin and over the
terminal area. The terminal margin has a few rusty-brown spots.

The larvae have been recorded feeding on Globifomes graveolens, Fomes species and possibly other bracket fungi.

References

Moths described in 1965
Scardiinae
Moths of North America
Moths of Asia